Joep Brandes (26 June 1920 – 6 May 1988) was a Dutch footballer. He played in three matches for the Netherlands national football team in 1949.

References

External links
 

1920 births
1988 deaths
Dutch footballers
Netherlands international footballers
Footballers from The Hague
Association football forwards
SC 't Gooi players
Feyenoord players
Nîmes Olympique players
Montpellier HSC players
Be Quick 1887 players
Dutch expatriate footballers
Expatriate footballers in France
Dutch football managers
PEC Zwolle managers
FC Eindhoven managers